Once Upon a Time is an American fairy tale drama television series created by Edward Kitsis and Adam Horowitz. The show takes place in the fictional seaside town of Storybrooke, Maine, whose residents are characters from various fairy tales transported to the "real world" town and robbed of their real memories by a powerful curse and borrows elements and characters from the Disney-franchise and popular Western literature, folklore, and fairy tales. It has been nominated for a variety of different awards, including the Primetime Emmy Awards, Satellite Award, Saturn Award, People's Choice Awards, Teen Choice Awards, etc. Once Upon a Time has been nominated for 91 awards in total and has won 12.

Total nominations and awards for the cast

Prestigious Awards

Creative Arts Emmy awards 
0 wins of 7 nominations

Costume Designers Guild awards 
0 wins of 4 nominations

Audience Awards

People's Choice awards 
0 wins of 12 nominations

Nickelodeon Kid's Choice awards 
0 wins of 4 nominations

Teen Choice awards 
3 win of 16 nominations

Critic & Association Awards

Casting Society awards 
0 wins of 1 nomination

Visual Effects Society awards 
0 wins of 4 nominations

International Awards

ALMA awards 
1 win of 1 nomination

Imagen Foundation awards 
0 wins of 1 nomination

Irish Film and Television awards 
0 wins of 1 nomination

The Joey awards 
1 win of 2 nominations

Leo awards 
1 win of 3 nominations

TV Quick awards 
0 wins of 1 nomination

Miscellaneous Awards

BMI Film & Television awards 
1 win of 1 nomination

Satellite awards 
0 wins of 3 nominations

Saturn awards 
0 wins of 4 nominations

TV Guide awards 
3 win of 6 nominations

Young Artist awards 
2 wins of 6 nominations

References

Awards
Lists of awards by television series